Uus Maailm (Estonian for "New World") is a subdistrict in the district of Kesklinn (Midtown), Tallinn, the capital of Estonia. It has a population of 7,442.

The subdistrict is named in reference to several "America" streets ("Greater America", "Lesser America" and "Middle America") in the area, named after the 19th century inn called "America".

Jaan Tootsen has directed a 2011 documentary titled The New World, on life in the area.

References

External links
Uue Maalma Selts (Uus Maailm's Society) 

Subdistricts of Tallinn
Kesklinn, Tallinn